River North Records was a Chicago-based record company. It was a subsidiary of Platinum Entertainment.

History 
River North Records was created by Steve Devick in 1994. It was named and created after River North Studios, which was also created by Devick. The single, "I Want to Be Like Mike" (in reference to Michael Jordan) was recorded for River North in 1991, based on a very popular commercial jingle created by Devick for Gatorade.

Contracts 
In 1993, River North Records signed a deal with vocalist Peter Cetera to record some of Cetera's albums. The albums were released in 1994. Billy Idol, David Bowie, Bon Jovi, and Dionne Warwick are some other artists that have recorded for River North Records.

The label also had a Nashville, Tennessee division specializing in country music which opened in 1994 . This label's first signee was Holly Dunn. The label folded in 1998.

Former artists
Steve Azar
Crystal Bernard
Peter Cetera
Rob Crosby
Holly Dunn
Steve Kolander
Ronna Reeves
S. Alan Taylor
Jamie Warren

Facility 
River North Studios had a 1,400-square-foot facility at 610 North Fairbanks Court in Chicago.

References 

American independent record labels
Record labels established in 1993
American country music record labels